Geraldia is a genus of flies in the family Tachinidae.

Species
Geraldia biseta Barraclough, 1992
Geraldia hirticeps Malloch, 1930
Geraldia longiplumosa Barraclough, 1992
Geraldia media Barraclough, 1992
Geraldia metallica Barraclough, 1992
Geraldia montana (Malloch, 1930)
Geraldia norrisi Barraclough, 1992
Geraldia nuda Barraclough, 1992
Geraldia pallida Barraclough, 1992
Geraldia paramonovi Barraclough, 1992
Geraldia paucipila Barraclough, 1992
Geraldia pollinosa Barraclough, 1992
Geraldia recessata Barraclough, 1992
Geraldia renatae Barraclough, 1992

References

Dexiinae
Diptera of Australasia
Tachinidae genera
Taxa named by John Russell Malloch